Pamela Cytrynbaum is an American journalist who teaches and specializes in investigative reporting and restorative justice. She is the executive director of the Chicago Innocence Center and a restorative justice practitioner.

Education
Cytrynbaum is a graduate of Evanston Township High School and received her BSJ from Northwestern University's Medill School of Journalism. She received her MAT from Oregon State University.

Career
As a journalist, Cytrynbaum reported on criminal justice issues for the New Orleans Times-Picayune before becoming a staff writer for the Chicago Tribune (1992–1997), where she was columnist Mike Royko's "legman." Her work has been published in The New York Times, The Miami Herald, The Chicago Sun-Times, The Washington Post, The New Orleans Times-Picayune, the Jewish Daily Forward, and The Oregonian.

Cytrynbaum is the executive director of The Chicago Innocence Center. As field advisor for the center's team of interns, she co-teaches weekly seminars alongside CIC President and Founder David Protess. Cytrynbaum is also in charge of fundraising and public speaking, outreach, managing the center's social media presence, reviewing cases, and overseeing the interns' work.

Cytrynbaum serves on the Advisory Board of the Center for Prosecutor Integrity (2014–present), a Maryland-based nonprofit fighting to end prosecutorial misconduct. She works in the restorative justice movement, collaborating with the Evanston Police Department to lead peace circles and organizing victim-offender conferences in District 65 elementary schools in Evanston (2014–present). She is also a member of the International Advisory Board of the Community of Restorative Researchers.

She is a former blogger for NBCUniversal (2011–2012). She currently writes about parenting, divorce, and various social justice issues as a regular blogger for both Psychology Today (2009–present) and Teaching Tolerance, the educational magazine of The Southern Poverty Law Center (2011–present).

Teaching
For over 7 years, Cytrynbaum taught journalism and media courses at Oregon State University and in the University of Oregon’s School of Journalism and Communication. There, she worked with faculty to create the High School Journalism Workshop for Minority Students.

From 2005–2007, Cytrynbaum taught American Studies and Journalism at Brandeis University where she served as associate director of the Schuster Institute for Investigative Journalism and director of the Justice Brandeis Innocence Project (now the Justice Brandeis Law Project).

Cytrynbaum taught undergraduate and graduate journalism courses in writing, reporting, and multimedia journalism at Northwestern University's Medill School of Journalism from 2010–2012. She won the Students' Choice Award For Teaching] in 2012.

Works
Cytrynbaum's writings have appeared in a number of publications which include:
The New York Times
The Washington Post
Psychology Today 
The Times-Picayune
Teaching Tolerance
The Miami Herald
Chicago Tribune
The Oregonian
The Chicago Sun-Times

References

1966 births
Chicago Tribune people
Living people
Miami Herald people
The New York Times writers
Medill School of Journalism alumni
Northwestern University faculty
University of Oregon faculty
Place of birth missing (living people)
Wrongful conviction advocacy